Botanical Survey of India (BSI) located in Kolkata, West Bengal, India. It was founded on 13 February 1890, is Government of India Ministry of Environment, Forest and Climate Change's organization for survey, research and conservation of plant wealth of India, flora and endangered species of India, including by collecting and maintaining germplasm and gene bank of endangered, patent and vulnerable plant species.

History

BSI was formally instituted by East India Company (EIC) on 13 February 1890 under the direction of Sir George King who became first ex-officio director, earlier he had been superintendent of Royal Botanic Garden, Calcutta since 1871. The Calcutta Garden became the headquarters of the Survey and was given regional responsibility for Bengal, Assam, North East, Burma, and the Andaman and Nicobar Islands.

Prior to 1890, EIC had already established botanical gardens at Sibpur, Pune, Saharanpur and Madras as centres for improving botanical knowledge and experimentation under the local Governments, for example Saharanpoor botanical garden, dating earlier than 1750, was acquired by EIC in 1817 for growing medicinal plants. Most of the EIC botanical gardens' work was for the cultivation of plants for exploiting resources of India for commerce and trade.

Academic and research program
Botanical Survey of India also offers Fellowship for doing research in Plant Taxonomy and also offers post doctorate fellowships to those who are trained in Taxonomy and want to continue their research related to the mandate of BSI.

Publications

Apart from the Publishing Flora of India series books, states floras, flora of Protected regions and Red Data Book of Indian Plants, BSI have also known for its various annual publications some of them are:

Plant Discoveries: Plant Discoveries is an annual bilingual publication of Botanical Survey of India, having most authentic information on India's plant wealth. As per recent release of Plant Discoveries 2019 by Botanical Survey of India, there is total of 18800 species of angiosperms, 82 species of gymnosperms, 1307 species of pteridophytes, 15447 species of fungi, 7434 species of algae, 2786 species of bryophytes, 2981 species of lichens and 1239 species of microbes in India, which is approximately 8 percent of total recorded plant species in world. Since its reorganization, in 1954, BSI officials described 01 new families, 42 new genus and 1719 new species and infra-specific taxon. During 2019, total 253 plants has been discovered by scientist of BSI and other institutes. Nelumbo is a biannual journal published by the Botanical Survey of India. The journal is peer-reviewed and authentic journal of plant taxonomy and plant sciences. As per recent NAAS rating 2019 the journal rated 4.17.

According to the Botanical Survey of India, India is currently having 8000 species of medicinal plants. Therefore the ministry of Ayush provides financial support in the form of Subsidies, for the cultivation of various medicinal plants and the species which are required by AYUSH systems and also to take care of other plants which are on the verge of extinction.

See also
 List of Botanical Gardens in India 
 List of botanical gardens worldwide
 National Botanical Research Institute
 Tropical Botanic Garden and Research Institute

References

External links
 

Botanists active in India
Executive branch of the government of India
Flora of the Indian subcontinent
Flora of the Andaman Islands
Flora of the Nicobar Islands
Natural history of India
Organisations based in Kolkata
1890 establishments in British India
Environmental organisations based in India